Meniellus maculicollis is a species of leaf beetle. It is distributed in eastern Nigeria, the Democratic Republic of the Congo, Sudan and Ivory Coast. It was described by Martin Jacoby in 1897.

References 

Eumolpinae
Beetles of the Democratic Republic of the Congo
Insects of West Africa
Insects of Sudan
Taxa named by Martin Jacoby
Beetles described in 1897